Cobbley may refer to:

Cobbley, character in The Mouse That Roared (film)
Robert Cobbley, MP
Uncle Tom Cobley, a British figure of speech